The lamiids are a group of about 40 interrelated families of flowering plants. They include about 40,000 species, representing one-seventh of the total diversity of flowering plants, and about half of all asterid species. Like most asterids, they tend to have petals that are fused with each other and with the bases of the stamens, and just one integument (covering) around the embryo sac. In lamiids, the fusion of the petals tends to occur late in their development, and the bases of the petals are usually beneath the ovaries. 

Of the eight lamiid orders, five have more than one family: Garryales, Gentianales, Icacinales, Lamiales and Solanales. Garryales and Icacinales include trees and shrubs with leaves that usually have stalks but no stipules; in Icacinales, the leaves are arranged spirally. Gentianales species have pitted wood and opposite leaves that are joined across the stem.  In Lamiales, plants are mostly herbaceous with opposite leaves, and the five-lobed flowers have approximate mirror-image symmetry. Solanales species usually have sepals that continue to grow with age, even when the plant is fruiting.

Legend

Lamiid families

See also

Notes

Citations

References
 
 
   See http://creativecommons.org/licenses/by/4.0/ for license.
 
 
  
 
 
 
  See their terms-of-use license.
 
 
 
 
 

Systematic
Taxonomic lists (families)
Gardening lists
Lists of plants